Ethane dimethanesulfonate (EDS) is an organic compound with formula (CH2OSO2CH3)2. It can be regarded as the esterification product of one glycol and two Methanesulfonic acids. EDS can eliminate all adult Leydig cells in testis of adult male rats, after which Leydig cells will regenerate from stem cells.

See also
 Busulfan

References 

Glycol esters
Mesylate esters